The Copa República 1983 was an official Chilean Cup tournament. The competition started on January 11, 1984, and concluded on March 7, 1984. Universidad Católica won the competition for their second time, beating Naval 1–0 in the final. Played on early 1984, the tournament was the second official cup competition of the season 1983.

Calendar

First round

|}

* Qualified as "Best Loser"

Second round

|}

Third round

|}

* Qualified as "Best Loser"

Semifinals

Final

Top goalscorers
Juvenal Olmos (U. Católica) 3 goals
Dagoberto Donoso (Naval) 3 goals
Ricardo Flores (Naval) 3 goals
Fidel Dávila (D. Iquique) 3 goals
Víctor Cabrera (R. Atacama) 3 goals
Julio Rodríguez (D. Antofagasta) 3 goals
Pablo Prieto (Rangers) 3 goals
Juan C. Letelier (Cobreloa) 3 goals
Luis Araneda (Everton) 3 goals

See also
 1983 Campeonato Nacional
 1983 Copa Polla Gol

Sources
Revista Deporte Total (Santiago, Chile) January–March 1984 (revised scores & information)
Diario La Tercera de la Hora (Santiago, Chile) April 8, 1984 (final match)
RSSSF (secondary source, too many mistakes)

Copa Chile
1983 R
1983 in Chilean football